Jacek Stryjenski (born 1922 in Kraków, died 1961 in Geneva) was a Swiss painter and decorator .  Jacek Stryjenski made frescos in churches in Switzerland (mosaics in St. Francis Church in Geneva) and France, as well as murals and mosaics that can be seen in various places in Geneva. He also designed many marionettes and much of the décor for the Puppet Theatre of Geneva.

He created the Grand Théâtre de Genève's iron curtain and ceiling made of gold- and silver-leafed sheets of brushed aluminum that has more than a thousand "stars" made of glass lights.

External links
 Opéra de Genève

20th-century Swiss painters
Swiss male painters
1922 births
1961 deaths
Fresco painters
20th-century Swiss male artists